Joan of Évreux (1310 – 4 March 1371) was Queen of France and Navarre as the third wife of King Charles IV of France.

Life
She was the daughter of Louis, Count of Évreux and Margaret of Artois. Because Joan was Charles's first cousin, the couple required papal permission to marry, which they obtained from Pope John XXII. They had three daughters, Jeanne, Marie and Blanche, who were unable to inherit the throne under principles of Salic law. The royal couple's lack of sons caused the end of the direct line of the Capetian dynasty.

Joan died on 4 March 1371 in her château at Brie-Comte-Robert, in the Île-de-France region, some twenty miles southeast of Paris. She was buried at the Basilica of St Denis, the necropolis of the Kings of France.

Legacy
Two of Joan's remarkable possessions survive: her book of hours and a statue of the Virgin and Child. The Book of Hours, known as the  Hours of Jeanne d'Evreux, is in The Cloisters collection of the Metropolitan Museum of Art in New York. It was commissioned from the artist Jean Pucelle between 1324 and 1328, probably as a gift from her husband.  The book contains the usual prayers of the canonical hours as arranged for the laity along with the notable inclusion of the office dedicated to St Louis, her great-grandfather. The small statue of the Virgin and Child (gilded silver and enamel, 69 cm high), which Jeanne left to the monastery of St Denis outside Paris, is in the Louvre Museum.

References

Sources

External links

 The Hours of Jeanne d'Evreux at the Cloisters

|-

|-

1310 births
1371 deaths
French queens consort
Navarrese royal consorts
Countesses of Champagne
House of Évreux
Burials at the Basilica of Saint-Denis
14th-century French people
14th-century French women